Ukraine originally planned to participate in the Eurovision Song Contest 2019 with the song "Siren Song" written by Hanna Korsun and Mikhail Busin. The song was performed by Maruv, which is the artistic name of singer Hanna Korsun. The Ukrainian broadcaster National Public Broadcasting Company of Ukraine (UA:PBC) organised a national final in collaboration with commercial broadcaster STB in order to select the Ukrainian entry for the 2019 contest in Tel Aviv, Israel. The national selection consisted of two semi-finals, held on 9 and 16 February 2019, and a final, held on 23 February 2019; eight entries competed in each semi-final with the top three from each semi-final advancing to the final. In the final, "Siren Song" performed by Maruv was selected as the winner following the combination of votes from a three-member jury panel and a public televote.

Ukraine was drawn to compete in the first semi-final of the Eurovision Song Contest which took place on 14 May 2019. However, UA:PBC announced its withdrawal from the contest on 27 February after Maruv refused to sign her participation agreement, as well as failed attempts of internally selecting a representative among other competing artists in the national selection.

Background 

Prior to the 2019 contest, Ukraine had participated in the Eurovision Song Contest fifteen times since its first entry in 2003, winning it in 2004 with the song "Wild Dances" performed by Ruslana and in 2016 with the song "1944" performed by Jamala. Following the introduction of semi-finals for the 2004, Ukraine had managed to qualify to final in every contest they participated in thus far. Ukraine had been the runner-up in the contest on two occasions: in 2007 with the song "Dancing Lasha Tumbai" performed by Verka Serduchka and in 2008 with the song "Shady Lady" performed by Ani Lorak. Ukraine's least successful result had been 24th place, which they achieved during the 2017, with the song "Time" performed by O.Torvald.

The Ukrainian national broadcaster, National Television Company of Ukraine (UA:PBC), broadcasts the event within Ukraine and organises the selection process for the nation's entry. UA:PBC confirmed their intentions to participate at the 2019 Eurovision Song Contest on 24 September 2018. In the past, UA:PBC had alternated between both internal selections and national finals in order to select the Ukrainian entry. Since 2016, the broadcaster, in collaboration with commercial broadcaster STB, had set up national finals with several artists to choose both the song and performer to compete at Eurovision for Ukraine, with both the public and a panel of jury members involved in the selection. UA:PBC's collaboration with STB would have continued into 2021.

Before Eurovision

Vidbir 2019 

Vidbir 2019 was the fourth edition of Vidbir which selected the Ukrainian entry for the Eurovision Song Contest 2019. The competition took place at the Palace of Culture "KPI" in Kyiv and consisted of two semi-finals held on 9 and 16 February 2019 and a final on 23 February 2019. All shows in the competition were hosted by Serhiy Prytula and broadcast on UA:Pershyi, UA:Kultura, UA: and STB as well as online via UA:PBC and STB's YouTube broadcasts. The final was also broadcast via radio on UA:Radio Promin.

Format 

The selection of the competing entries for the national final and ultimately the Ukrainian Eurovision entry took place over three stages. In the first stage, artists and songwriters had the opportunity to apply for the competition through an online submission form. Sixteen acts were selected and announced on 9 January 2019. The second stage consisted of the televised semi-finals which took place on 9 and 16 February 2019 with eight acts competing in each show. Three acts were selected to advance from each semi-final based on the 50/50 combination of votes from a public televote and an expert jury. Both the public televote and the expert jury assigned scores ranging from 1 (lowest) to 8 (highest) and the three entries that had the highest number of points following the combination of these scores advanced to the final. The third stage was the final, which took place on 23 February 2019 and featured the six acts that qualified from the semi-finals vying to represent Ukraine in Tel Aviv. The winner was selected via the 50/50 combination of votes from a public televote and an expert jury. Both the public televote and the expert jury assigned scores ranging from 1 (lowest) to 6 (highest) and the entry that had the highest number of points following the combination of these scores was declared the winner. Viewers participating in the public televote during the three live shows had the opportunity to submit a single vote per phone number for each of the participating entries via SMS or the Teleportal mobile application. In the event of a tie during the semi-finals and final, the tie was decided in favour of the entry that received the highest score from the public televote.

The jury panel that voted during the three shows consisted of:
Andriy Danylko – comedian and singer, represented Ukraine in 2007 as the drag artist Verka Serduchka
Jamala – singer-songwriter, winner of the Eurovision Song Contest 2016 for Ukraine
Yevhen Filatov (The Maneken) – singer and producer, creator of group Onuka

Competing entries 
Artists and composers had the opportunity to submit their entries via an online submission form which accepted entries between 20 October 2018 and 25 December 2018. Composer and producer Ruslan Kvinta was assigned as the music producer of the show and was the lead in reviewing the 860 received submissions and shortlisting entries to compete in the national final. On 9 January 2019, the sixteen selected competing acts were announced. On 22 January 2019, it was announced that "", written by Tetiana Reshetniak and Vitaliy Telezin and to have been performed by Tayanna, was withdrawn from the competition and replaced by the song "Siren Song" performed by Maruv. The sixteen acts were allocated to one of two semi-finals during a draw that took place on 22 January, which was hosted by Ruslan Kvinta.

Shows

Semi-finals 
The two semi-finals took place on 9 and 16 February 2019. In each semi-final eight acts competed and the top three entries determined following the combination of votes from a public televote and an expert jury advanced to the final of the competition, while the remaining five entries were eliminated. In addition to the performances of the competing entries, 2018 Ukrainian Eurovision entrant Mélovin performed the song "" as a guest in the first semi-final, while 2019 Czech Eurovision entrant Lake Malawi performed the 2019 Czech entry "Friend of a Friend" as a guest in the second semi-final.

Final 
The final took place on 23 February 2019. The six entries that qualified from the semi-finals competed. The winner, "Siren Song" performed by Maruv, was selected through the combination of votes from a public televote and an expert jury. Ties were decided in favour of the entries that received higher scores from the public televote. In addition to the performances of the competing entries, guests included jury member Jamala performing the song "Solo", and 2019 French Eurovision entrant Bilal Hassani performing the 2019 French entry "Roi".

Controversy 

During the final of Vidbir 2019, it was announced that UA:PBC had reserved the right to change the decision made by the jury and Ukrainian public. Following Maruv's victory, it was reported that the broadcaster had sent her management a contract, requiring Maruv to delay all upcoming appearances and performances in Russia in order to become the Ukrainian representative; it is considered controversial for Ukrainian artists to tour in Russia following the 2014 Russian military intervention in Ukraine. After it became clear that she would be performing in two concerts in Russia the following months, Vice Prime Minister and Minister of Culture Vyacheslav Kyrylenko stated that artists who toured in Russia or "did not recognise the territorial integrity of Ukraine" should not take part in Eurovision. She was also given 48 hours to sign the contract or be replaced. The day afterwards, Maruv revealed that the broadcaster's contract had additionally banned her from improvising on stage and communicating with any journalist without the permission of the broadcaster, and required her to fully comply with any requests from the broadcaster. If she were to not follow any of these clauses, she would be fined ₴2 million (~€67,000). Maruv also stated that the broadcaster would not give her any financial compensation for the competition and would not pay for the trip to Tel Aviv.

On 25 February, both Maruv and the broadcaster confirmed that she would not represent Ukraine in Israel due to disputes within the contract, and that another act would be chosen. National final runner-up Freedom Jazz announced on 26 February that they had rejected the broadcaster's offer to represent Ukraine as well, with third-place finisher Kazka confirming they had rejected the offer as well the following day.

Withdrawal 
On 27 February, UA:PBC announced Ukraine's withdrawal from the contest, due to the inability to select a representative among other competing artists in the national final. Despite this, the contest was broadcast in the country.

References

External links 

2019
Countries in the Eurovision Song Contest 2019
Eurovision